Viktor Ryashko (28 January 1964 – 19 July 2020) was a Ukrainian professional football coach and a player.

Career
He was a product of FC Trudovi Rezervy Lviv. His first trainer was Vadym Bilotserkivskyi.

On 12 January 2012, Ryashko was appointed as the sporting director of club FC Hoverla Uzhhorod in Ukrainian Premier League.

He was the father of Ukrainian footballers Viktor Ryashko and Mykhaylo Ryashko.

Ryashko died on 19 July 2020, at the age of 56, after his car crashed during a road accident.

References

External links
Profile at Official FFU site (Ukr)

1964 births
2020 deaths
Soviet footballers
Ukrainian footballers
Ukrainian football managers
FC Bukovyna Chernivtsi players
FC Nyva Ternopil players
FC Kremin Kremenchuk players
FC Nyva Ternopil managers
FC Lviv managers
FC Karpaty Mukacheve players
Ukrainian First League players
FC Hoverla Uzhhorod managers
MFA Mukachevo managers
Ukrainian Premier League managers
People from Mukachevo
Road incident deaths in Ukraine
Association football midfielders
Sportspeople from Zakarpattia Oblast